Terradactyl is the second collaborative studio album by Serengeti & Polyphonic. It was released on Anticon in 2009.

Critical reception

Marisa Brown of AllMusic gave the album 4.5 out of 5 stars, calling it "an impressive, difficult, intelligent record that manages to be accessible, compelling, and nearly indecipherable all at once." She added: "Much, if not most, of this is thanks to Polyphonic, a talented producer who writes arrangements whose air of simplicity belies their complexity." Eddie Fleischer of Cleveland Scene said: "For those who complain that rap has gone stale, Terradactyl proves otherwise."

Track listing

Personnel
Credits adapted from liner notes.

 Serengeti – vocals
 Polyphonic – music
 Renee-Louise Carafice – additional vocals (2, 11), guitar (2), harp (11)
 John Pheiffer – cello (4)
 Doseone – additional vocals (6)
 Buck 65 – additional vocals (9)
 Jeremy Horwitz – mandolin (10)
 William Waheed Freyman – recording
 Mike Wells – mastering
 Mike Davis – artwork

References

External links
 

2009 albums
Anticon albums
Serengeti (rapper) albums
Collaborative albums